This is the discography of Young Maylay, an American rapper.

Discography

Mixtapes

Singles

Guest appearances

Music videos

References

Hip hop discographies
Discographies of American artists